Milan Kopic (born 23 November 1985) is a Czech former footballer who played as a defender. He is the older brother of Czech footballer Jan Kopic.

Career
Kopic was the second Czech player to play for Dutch side SC Heerenveen, where Michal Švec had been playing since January 2008. On 15 January 2010, Heerenveen loaned him to Slavia Prague on loan until June 2010.

International career
Kopic made his debut for the Czech Republic U21 team in 2006.

Honours
 KNVB Cup: 2009

External links
 
 
 Profile on fotbal.idnes.cz
 Profile on Fotbal.cz

1984 births
Living people
People from Pelhřimov
Association football defenders
Czech footballers
Czech Republic under-21 international footballers
FC Vysočina Jihlava players
FK Mladá Boleslav players
SC Heerenveen players
Czech First League players
SK Slavia Prague players
Eredivisie players
ŠK Slovan Bratislava players
Slovak Super Liga players
Expatriate footballers in Slovakia
Czech expatriate sportspeople in Slovakia
Czech expatriate footballers
Expatriate footballers in the Netherlands
Czech expatriate sportspeople in the Netherlands
Sportspeople from the Vysočina Region